InsureandGo (officially known as Insure & Go Insurance Services Limited) is a British travel insurance company which is owned by AllClear Insurance. 

As well as the United Kingdom, InsureandGo also has operations in the Republic of Ireland and Australia.

In 2018, InsureandGo reported providing 3.1 million travel insurance policies to UK customers, an increase of 1 million over the previous year.

History
InsureandGo was founded in 2000 in Braintree, Essex, United Kingdom, where they were based for the next six years.

In November 2005, InsureandGo claimed to be one of the first companies to remove the terrorism exclusion clause from their policies. InsureandGo also said that they had led the travel insurance market in doing this and urged other companies to do the same.

Due to the company's expansion, InsureandGo relocated to new offices in Southend-on-Sea in 2006, with the effect of bringing new jobs to the area. The company had bought Southend-based Travel Claims Services in September of the previous year.

In December 2006, InsureandGo hired chartered accountants BDO Stoy Hayward to explore its options, including the possibility of selling the company for a reported £100 million.

In May 2013, InsureandGo sponsored a one-day event in London called 'The World on Regent Street'. The event included activities and displays from a range of different countries, including China, Argentina, Trinidad and Tobago and Turkey.

During the summer of 2014, InsureandGo gave away free ice cream at London's Canary Wharf and the South Bank as part of its 'Around the World in 80 Scoops' event. The ice cream was manufactured by Southend-based Rossi Ice Cream, and featured strange flavours which had been inspired by different countries.

In November 2015, it was announced that InsureandGo would be relocating most of its UK operations to Bristol.

In 2020, InsureandGo has partnered with PCI Pal. The collaboration is to introduce a new cloud-based system to meet PCI enforcement criteria, to offer greater compliance rigour when managing Cardholder not Present payments.

Going international
In early 2010, InsureandGo launched a range of travel insurance products for residents of Australia. In October 2011, InsureandGo launched in the Republic of Ireland.

Purchase by MAPFRE ASISTENCIA
Spanish insurance company MAPFRE ASISTENCIA purchased InsureandGo in October 2010 for an undisclosed sum. InsureandGo was then a wholly owned subsidiary of MAPFRE Asistencia Compañia Internacional de Seguros y Reaseguros Sociedad Anonima, which forms part of the MAPFRE Group.

Sale by MAPFRE ASISTENCIA 
In September 2021, AllClear Travel Insurance acquired InsureandGo in a deal that will more than double its size in the UK travel insurance market.

References

Travel insurance companies
Insurance companies of the United Kingdom
Online insurance companies
Financial services companies established in 2000
British brands
British companies established in 2000